Lešná is a municipality and village in Vsetín District in the Zlín Region of the Czech Republic. It has about 2,000 inhabitants.

Administrative parts
Villages of Jasenice, Lhotka nad Bečvou, Mštěnovice, Perná, Příluky and Vysoká are administrative parts of Lešná.

Geography
It lies in the Moravian-Silesian Foothills, on the right bank of the Bečva River.

History
The first written mention of Lešná is from 1355. From 1481 to 1628, it was owned by the Pražma family.

Sights

The Lešná Castle was built in the first half of the 17th century in the site of a medieval fort. The late Renaissance castle was rebuilt in the Neoclassical style in the late 19th century. The park has a rich collection of mainly exotic trees and shrubs.

The Church of Saint Michael the Archangel is the oldest building in the municipality. It was built in the Baroque style in 1635.

Notable people
Josef Seilern (1883–1939), Austrian-Czech ornithologist and oologist

References

External links

Villages in Vsetín District
Moravian Wallachia